Par Chunak (also Romanized as Par Chūnak; also known as Par Chānak and Par Javanak) is a village in Donbaleh Rud-e Jonubi Rural District, Dehdez District, Izeh County, Khuzestan Province, Iran. At the 2006 census, its population was 231, in 45 families.

References 

Populated places in Izeh County